David R. Hastings III is an American politician and lawyer from Maine. Hastings served as a Republican State Senator from Maine's 13th District, representing parts of Cumberland and Oxford Counties, including his residence of Fryeburg. A lifelong resident of Fryeburg, Hastings earned a B.A. from Bowdoin College and a J.D. from Temple University Beasley School of Law. He was first elected to the Maine Senate in 2004 and was unable to run for re-election in 2012 due to term-limits. He was replaced by fellow Republican James Hamper.

Hastings is a practicing lawyer in Fryeburg.

References

Year of birth missing (living people)
Living people
People from Fryeburg, Maine
Bowdoin College alumni
Temple University Beasley School of Law alumni
Maine lawyers
Republican Party Maine state senators
21st-century American politicians